Elseng (Morwap, Janggu, Sawa, Tabu) is a poorly documented Papuan language spoken by about 300 people (in 1991) in the Indonesian province of Papua. It is also known as Morwap, which means "what is it?" ‘Morwap’ is vigorously rejected as a language name by speakers and government officials.

Elseng is spoken in Omon village, Gresi Selatan district, Jayapura Regency; it is also called Tabu or Tapu.

Classification
Laycock classified Elseng as a language isolate, but noted pronominal similarities with the Border languages. Ross included it in Border because of these similarities, but noted that it does not appear to share any lexical similarities with the family. However, this may be an effect of the paucity of data on Elseng. Foley similarly classifies Elseng as an isolate.

An automated computational analysis (ASJP 4) by Müller et al. (2013) also found lexical similarities with the Border languages.

Phonology

Pronouns
Pronouns are:

Basic vocabulary
Elseng basic vocabulary from Menanti (2005), quoted in Foley (2018):

{| 
|+ Elseng basic vocabulary
! gloss !! Elseng
|-
| ‘bird’ || bisyas
|-
| ‘blood’ || sakwos
|-
| ‘bone’ || wok
|-
| ‘breast’ || pan
|-
| ‘ear’ || waskwos
|-
| ‘eat’ || tou
|-
| ‘egg’ || syungwin
|-
| ‘eye’ || nafon
|-
| ‘fire’ || bət
|-
| ‘give’ || venenggiʔ
|-
| ‘go’ || gele
|-
| ‘ground’ || mo
|-
| ‘hair’ || nimbias
|-
| ‘hear’ || sɨkwen
|-
| ‘leg’ || poksən
|-
| ‘louse’ || ku
|-
| ‘man’ || seseu
|-
| ‘moon’ || məm
|-
| ‘name’ || tin
|-
| ‘road, path’ || mol
|-
| ‘see’ || nɨnggwen
|-
| ‘sky’ || kuil
|-
| ‘stone’ || səpak
|-
| ‘sun’ || ningnaf
|-
| ‘tongue’ || mosən
|-
| ‘tooth’ || an
|-
| ‘tree’ || sək
|-
| ‘water’ || vetev
|-
| ‘woman’ || saun
|}

The following basic vocabulary words are from Voorhoeve (1971, 1975), as cited in the Trans-New Guinea database:

{| class="wikitable sortable"
! gloss !! Elseng
|-
| head || walambiap
|-
| hair || nimbias
|-
| ear || mo; uskŋs
|-
| eye || naf
|-
| nose || sənpokep
|-
| tooth || an
|-
| tongue || mɔs; mɔsən
|-
| leg || pokəs
|-
| louse || ku
|-
| dog || wəs
|-
| pig || wo
|-
| bird || bisjas; bisyas
|-
| egg || suŋun
|-
| blood || wətwən
|-
| bone || ok
|-
| skin || son; sɔn
|-
| breast || pan
|-
| tree || sək
|-
| man || sisɛu; sisew
|-
| woman || saɔ
|-
| sun || ninaf
|-
| moon || mɔm
|-
| water || wətel; wətəl
|-
| fire || bot; bɔt
|-
| stone || səpat
|-
| road, path || mul
|-
| eat || to
|}

Sentences and phrases
Example sentences and phrases in Elseng:

References

External links
Elseng language word list at TransNewGuinea.org
Burung, Wiem. 2000. "A brief note on Elseng." SIL Electronic Survey Reports 2000-001

Border languages (New Guinea)
Languages of western New Guinea
Unclassified languages of New Guinea